Easter Yeggs is a 1947 Looney Tunes theatrical animated short. The cartoon was released on June 28, 1947, and features Bugs Bunny and Elmer Fudd. The title is a play on "Easter eggs" and on "yegg", a slang term for a burglar or safecracker.

Plot 
Bugs Bunny finds the Easter Bunny (also called the "Easter Rabbit" throughout this cartoon) sitting on a rock, crying. The Easter Bunny tells Bugs that his feet are sore, so he cannot deliver the Easter eggs. Bugs takes up the job, not knowing that, every year, the Easter Bunny gets some "dumb bunny" to do his work for him. (The Easter Bunny characterization is taken from Mel Blanc's "Happy Postman" radio character, including the ironic catch phrase "Keep Smiling!")

The first house the "joyous bunny" visits bears a name by the door: Dead End Kid, the mean little red-haired kid who lives inside throws the egg (still raw) at Bugs' face, bites him in the leg and beats Bugs up before body-slamming him on the floor - all the while demanding, "I wanna Easter egg! I wanna Easter egg! I wanna Easter egg!" Bugs loses his cool and grabs the kid's arm, and then suddenly, Dead End Kid screams that Bugs has broken his arm and three huge thugs (one of them female) rush in, aiming guns at Bugs. Bugs barely escapes the hail of bullets (some of which spell the message "And stay out"). When Bugs rushes back to the Easter Bunny telling him he quits, the Easter Bunny gets him to "try once more".

Unfortunately, the next house is that of Elmer Fudd, the veteran wabbit hunter. Intent on making "Easter Rabbit Stew" out of the bunny, Fudd sets up an elaborate welcome and, disguised as a baby, hides his gun in a bassinet and climbs in. Just then Bugs arrives, but this time he's prepared for toddler resistance: he cracks the egg in Elmer's hands. Thus commences the classic chase and gags until Bugs manages to dump the Dead End Kid with Elmer (who beats Elmer on the head repeatedly with a hammer after Bugs paints Elmer's head to look like an Easter egg). Finally, Bugs plants a bomb painted like an Easter egg and leaves it for the Easter Bunny. When the Easter Bunny picks it up to finish his job, Bugs lights the fuse, proclaiming to the audience "it's the suspense that gets me," and the bomb explodes on the Easter Bunny, leaving the hapless hen-fruit handler hanging high up in a tree. Bugs' parting shot: "Remember, Doc, keep smiling!" (in reference to Mel Blanc's Happy Postman from the radio version of The George Burns and Gracie Allen Show). The cartoon irises out as Bugs starts laughing hysterically.

Home media
Easter Yeggs is available on the Looney Tunes Golden Collection: Volume 3 DVD box set and on Looney Tunes Platinum Collection: Volume 3 Blu-ray set.

See also 
 Looney Tunes and Merrie Melodies filmography (1940–1949)

References

External links

 

1947 films
1947 short films
1947 comedy films
1947 animated films
1940s Warner Bros. animated short films
Looney Tunes shorts
Bugs Bunny films
Elmer Fudd films
Easter Bunny in film
Films set in forests
Films directed by Robert McKimson
Films scored by Carl Stalling
Warner Bros. Cartoons animated short films
1940s English-language films